Ainia is an extinct genus of prehistoric ray-finned fish that lived during the early Toarcian stage of the Early Jurassic epoch.

See also

 List of prehistoric bony fish genera

References

Ionoscopiformes
Early Jurassic fish
Fossils of Germany